Birmingham Curzon Street station may refer to:

Birmingham Curzon Street railway station (1838-1966), closed railway station in Birmingham, England
Birmingham Curzon Street railway station, planned High Speed 2 station in Birmingham, England